The 1986 World Series of Poker (WSOP) was a series of poker tournaments held at Binion's Horseshoe.

Preliminary events

Main Event

There were 141 entrants to the main event. Each paid $10,000 to enter the tournament. 1985 World Champion Bill Smith made back-to-back Main Event final tables. Johnston, the eventual winner, was at the final table in 1985 when Smith won. Wendeen Eolis became the first female player to finish the main event in the money when she finished in 25th place.

Final table

Other High Finishes

NB: This list is restricted to top 30 finishers with an existing Wikipedia entry.

Notes

World Series of Poker
World Series of Poker
World Series of Poker